These are men's International Team records in international rugby, updated at the conclusion of the November Internationals window each year.

To view men's individual records, see International rugby union player records. To view records of the men's Rugby World Cup, see Records and statistics of the Rugby World Cup.

 World Rugby Ranking Leaders

Team

World Rankings

Highest rankings

Below is a list of the best and worst ranking positions for all nations who have ever been ranked among the top ten, since the ranking tables were first published on the 13 October 2003:

Most World Ranking points

Below is a list of the Top 10 most accumulated ranking points and corresponding fewest ranking points, since the ranking tables were first published on the 13 October 2003:

Longest tenure ranked at No. 1

England were ranked as No. 1 when the rankings were introduced in late 2003. New Zealand hold the record for the longest run as the No. 1 World Ranked team, spending just less than three months short of 10 years uninterrupted atop the rankings. Ireland currently top the world rankings. Not shown on the table, but the other nations to have been ranked No. 1, are Wales, spending two weeks in the top spot in 2019, before relinquishing the No. 1 spot to New Zealand, and France who held No. 1 for a week in 2022. Tenures are correct as of the last ranking update on 20 March 2023:

Nations in bold indicate the tenure is ongoing.

 South Africa did not play any matches in the 2020 calendar year due to complications faced with preparation and travel as a result of the COVID-19 pandemic.
 Amongst South Africa's matches in their recent tenure at No. 1 are three matches against British & Irish Lions, which do not affect ranking points.
Key: y = years, m = months, d = days.

Most matches played ranked at No. 1

New Zealand hold the record for the most matches played whilst defending the No. 1 World Ranking, playing 128 matches during that time. Ireland currently top the world rankings. Not shown on the table, but the other nations to have been ranked No. 1, are Wales, spending two weeks in the top spot in 2019, before relinquishing the No. 1 spot to New Zealand, and France who held No. 1 for a week in 2022. Tenures are correct as of 18 March 2023:

Nations in bold indicate the tenure is ongoing.

Key: y = years, m = months, d = days.

All-time

Most matches

Nations in italics are classed as Tier 2 since the beginning of the professional era (Aug. 1995), and primarily play other Tier 2 nations.

Up to date as of 23 July 2022

Most wins

Nations in italics are classed as Tier 2 since the beginning of the professional era (Aug. 1995), and primarily play other Tier 2 nations.

Up to date as of 23 July 2022

Most consecutive wins

In the professional era (Aug. 1995-), Teams that have played Tier 1 sides in 50% or more of their test matches in their winning run are eligible.

Most consecutive matches without loss

In the professional era (Aug. 1995-), teams that have played Tier 1 sides in 50% or more of their test matches in their winning run are eligible.
An 'N' indicates the unbeaten run contained only wins, with no draws.
 New Zealand and South Africa both recorded multiple draws in their unbeaten runs, as shown.

Most points

Nations in italics are classed as Tier 2 since the beginning of the professional era (Aug. 1995), and primarily play other Tier 2 nations.

Up to date as of 22 August 2022

Highest match attendance

Rugby World Cup

RWC titles

RWC tournament points

RWC tournament tries

RWC tournament conversions

RWC tournament penalties

RWC tournament drop goals

RWC match margins

RWC match points

RWC match tries

RWC match conversions

RWC match penalties

RWC match drop goals

Calendar year

Most wins

Teams that have played Tier 1 sides in 50% or more of their test matches in that year are eligible.

New Zealand, England and France are the only three Tier 1 nations to complete a calendar year with a 100% win rate in the professional era (Aug. 1995-present).

Most points

Teams that have played Tier 1 sides in 50% or more of their test matches in that year are eligible.

Most tries

Teams that have played Tier 1 sides in 50% or more of their test matches in that year are eligible.

Most conversions

Teams that have played Tier 1 sides in 50% or more of their test matches in that year are eligible.

Most penalties

Teams that have played Tier 1 sides in 50% or more of their test matches in that year are eligible.

Most drop goals

Teams that have played Tier 1 sides in 50% or more of their test matches in that year are eligible.

Nations highlighted in italics are classed as Tier 2 in the professional era (Aug. 1995–present)

Matches
Team records within test matches.

Most points

Test Matches that have included only Tier 1 Nations and/or Tier 2 Nations are eligible.

Most tries

Test Matches that have included only Tier 1 Nations and/or Tier 2 Nations are eligible.

Most conversions

Test Matches that have included only Tier 1 Nations and/or Tier 2 Nations are eligible.

Most penalties

Test Matches that have included only Tier 1 Nations and/or Tier 2 Nations are eligible.

 There are 18 Nations that have recorded 8 penalties in a Test Match. For the purpose of limiting the list to a reasonable size, the matches with the five highest scores by the team recording 8 penalties are shown here.

Most drop goals

Test Matches that have included only Tier 1 Nations and/or Tier 2 Nations are eligible.

 There are 37 instances that Nations have recorded 3 drop goals in a Test Match. For the purpose of limiting the list to a reasonable size, the matches with the seven highest scores by the team recording 3 drop goals are shown here.

Most aggregate points

Test Matches that have included only Tier 1 Nations and/or Tier 2 Nations are eligible.

Most aggregate tries

Test Matches that have included only Tier 1 Nations and/or Tier 2 Nations are eligible.

Most aggregate conversions

Test Matches that have included only Tier 1 Nations and/or Tier 2 Nations are eligible.

Most aggregate penalties

Test Matches that have included only Tier 1 Nations and/or Tier 2 Nations are eligible.

 There are 14 instances where 12 penalties have been recorded in a Test Match. For the purpose of limiting the list to a reasonable size, the five highest total-scoring matches are shown here.

Most aggregate drop goals

Test Matches that have included only Tier 1 Nations and/or Tier 2 Nations are eligible.

 There are 12 instances where 4 drop goals have been recorded in a Test Match. For the purpose of limiting the list to a reasonable size, the eight highest total scoring matches are shown here.

See also
 International rugby union player records
 Records and statistics of the Rugby World Cup
 List of international rugby union teams

References

External links
 Rugby Union Records
 Rugby Union Match Archive

Rugby union records and statistics